The Lightweight competition at the 2013 AIBA World Boxing Championships was held from 15–26 October 2013. Boxers were limited to a weight of 60 kilograms.

Medalists

Seeds

  Domenico Valentino (semifinals)
  Fazliddin Gaibnazarov (third round)
  Anvar Yunusov (second round)
  Robson Conceição (final)
  Miklós Varga (third round)
  Berik Abdrakhmanov (semifinals)
  Sailom Adi (quarterfinals)
  Vazgen Safaryants (second round)

Draw

Finals

Top half

Section 1

Section 2

Bottom half

Section 3

Section 4

References
Draw

2013 AIBA World Boxing Championships